Petr Strapáč (born October 11, 1989) is a Czech professional ice hockey player. He played with HC Vítkovice in the Czech Extraliga during the 2010–11 Czech Extraliga season.

References

External links

1989 births
Czech ice hockey forwards
HC Vítkovice players
Living people
Sportspeople from Ostrava